Holly Woodlawn (October 26, 1946 – December 6, 2015) was a transgender American actress and Warhol superstar who appeared in the films Trash (1970) and Women in Revolt (1971). She is also known as the Holly in Lou Reed's hit glam rock song "Walk on the Wild Side".

Early life 
Woodlawn was born in Juana Díaz, Puerto Rico, to a German-American father who was a soldier in the U.S. Army, and Aminta Rodriguez, a native Puerto Rican,  and grew up in Miami Beach, where she came out at a young age.  She adopted the name Holly from the heroine of Breakfast at Tiffany's, and in 1969 added the surname from a sign she saw on an episode of I Love Lucy. After changing her name she began to falsely tell people she was the heiress to Woodlawn Cemetery.

In 1962, at the age of fifteen, Woodlawn ran away from home, leaving Florida heading north. She recollected that "I hocked some jewelry and ... made it all the way to Georgia, where the money ran out and ... had to hitchhike the rest of the way" to New York City.

She recalled in her memoir, A Low Life in High Heels:

At the age of 16, when most kids were cramming for trigonometry exams, I was turning tricks, living off the streets and wondering when my next meal was coming.

By 1969, she had considered sex reassignment surgery, but decided against it.

Film career 
Woodlawn met Andy Warhol at the Factory, at a screening of Flesh (1968). Through him she met Jackie Curtis, who cast Woodlawn in her play Heaven Grand in Amber Orbit in the autumn of 1969.

In October, she originally was given a bit role in Trash, but so impressed director and screenwriter Paul Morrissey that he re-wrote it to give her a much larger role. In Trash, Joe Dallesandro plays a heroin addict on a quest to score who, ambivalent about his sexuality, has a transgender girlfriend played by Woodlawn. The pair contrasted the other with violent episodes of over-dose matched by improvisation and sulky rejection. Woodlawn ad libbed many of the lines herself, preferring creativity to strict adherence to the script. Woodlawn was paid $25 per day during filming, spending the last day's on heroin. In October 1970, she received word from the Academy of Motion Picture Arts and Sciences that George Cukor, supported by others, was petitioning the Academy to nominate her for Best Actress for her work in Trash, but nothing came of this. In Morrissey's next film she was joined by others in Warhol's pantheon of stars, to play in Women in Revolt, a satirical look at the women's rights movement and the PIGS (politically involved girls). In this film, she became one of the first people to say the word cunt in cinema.

In May 1971, Woodlawn replaced Candy Darling at the La MaMa theatre in a production of Vain Victory written and directed by Jackie Curtis. She was arrested and briefly incarcerated in Puerto Rico after being caught shoplifting. Woodlawn created a stir when she was arrested in New York City after impersonating the wife of the French Ambassador to the United Nations. When arrested, she was taken to the New York Women's House of Detention and then transferred to a men's facility when the fact that she was transgender was discovered.

In 1972, director Robert Kaplan and cinematographer Paul Glickman concocted the idea of a movie whose premise would be using a transgender woman as the lead in a film without revealing the sex of the actress. Woodlawn played a young, starstruck girl hoping for success as an actress in New York City. The film, Scarecrow in a Garden of Cucumbers, was a low budget, 16 mm, unsuccessful musical feature. The song "In The Very Last Row", written by Marshall Barer, was performed by Bette Midler.

In 1977, Woodlawn moved to San Francisco. She returned to New York later in the year, appearing on Geraldo Rivera's talk show, before being jailed again in 1978 for violating terms of probation. She was released on the appeal of politician Ethan Geto, who helped organize a benefit for her. By 1979, she had surrendered to a faltering career, cut her hair and moved back to her parents' home in Miami, while working as a busser at Benihana. She also appeared in films by Rosa von Praunheim, for example in 1979 in Tally Brown, New York. Woodlawn was friend with both (the director and Tally Brown).

Back in New York in the mid-1980s, she became a featured singer in Gabriel Rotello's Downtown Dukes and Divas revues at clubs such as The Limelight and The Palladium, and a star of various musicals and revues mounted by the songwriting and producing team of Scott Wittman and Marc Shaiman. In 1991 she published her autobiography A Low Life in High Heels with writer Jeff Copeland.

During the 1990s, Woodlawn achieved a modest film and theatrical comeback, making cameo appearances in productions such as Night Owl (1993) and Billy's Hollywood Screen Kiss (1998). After Warhol's death, she was interviewed frequently on his life and influence. At the time of her death she resided in West Hollywood where in the late 90s she participated in riot grrrl shows with Revolution Rising, and recorded spoken words for songs with experimental recordings by the band Lucid Nation. In 1999 she was in a controversial film about conjoined twins who live in a run down motel in a small town. Twin Falls Idaho was followed four years later by Milwaukee, Minnesota. More recently she acted in Transparent, a U.S. television series about a transgender mother played by Jeffrey Tambor.

Appearance 
When Holly Woodlawn appeared in public she would dress as a dazzling alternative image of Jean Harlow, complete with wig and frosted lipstick. She presented as a glamorous actress, saying:

I was very happy when I gradually became a Warhol superstar. I felt like Elizabeth Taylor. Little did I realize that not only would there be no money, but that your star would flicker for two seconds and that was it – the drugs, the parties, it was fabulous.

In the opinion of Vincent Canby, "Holly Woodlawn, especially, is something to behold, a comic book Mother Courage who fancies herself as Marlene Dietrich but sounds more often like Phil Silvers."

Cabaret artiste 
Woodlawn's first cabaret engagement was a solo act in 1973 at Reno Sweeney in New York. The following year, she performed with Jackie Curtis in "Cabaret in the Sky" at the New York Cultural Center.  In the early 2000s, she resumed performing cabaret in sold-out shows in New York and Los Angeles. She continued to travel with her cabaret show, most recently appearing in Manhattan's Laurie Beechman Theatre in 2013.

Death 
Woodlawn fell seriously ill in June 2015, and was hospitalized at Cedars-Sinai Medical Center in Los Angeles, California. Tests later revealed that she had lesions on her liver and brain. The lesions were later determined to be cancer. Woodlawn's health improved enough for her to be sent home, where she continued treatment and received in-home healthcare. She was later forced to vacate her West Hollywood, California, apartment due to flooding, and entered an assisted living facility in October.

Woodlawn died of brain and liver cancer in Los Angeles on December 6, 2015.

Woodlawn was included during the In-Memoriam segment at the 88th Academy Awards.

Legacy 
Woodlawn's estate founded the Holly Woodlawn Memorial Fund for Transgender Youth at the Los Angeles LGBT Center.

Lou Reed refers to Woodlawn in his song "Walk on the Wild Side", the opening verse of which describes her hitchhiking journey and gender transition:

Holly came from Miami, F-L-A
Hitchhiked her way across the USA
Plucked her eyebrows on the way
Shaved her legs and then he was a she
She says, "Hey, babe, take a walk on the wild side."

Filmography

References

Further reading 
 
 
 
 Abagnalo, George, "In Memory of Holly Woodlawn," Interview Magazine, August 1975 (republished online December 7, 2015).

External links 

 
 
 Sadie Lee; Painting a Warhol Legend, Woman's Hour, BBC Radio 4, 26 April 2007
 Holly Woodlawn Obituary

1946 births
2015 deaths
People from Juana Díaz, Puerto Rico
American film actresses
20th-century Puerto Rican actresses
Deaths from brain cancer in the United States
LGBT Hispanic and Latino American people
Puerto Rican LGBT entertainers
Transgender memoirists
Transgender actresses
Deaths from liver cancer
American people of Puerto Rican descent
Puerto Rican LGBT writers
20th-century American actresses
21st-century American actresses
Puerto Rican people of German descent
Hispanic and Latino American actresses
Burials at Hollywood Forever Cemetery
People associated with The Factory
Puerto Rican LGBT actors
American transgender writers